Rabah is a Local Government Area in Sokoto State, Nigeria. Its headquarters are in the town of Rabah.

It has an area of 2,433 km and a population of 149,165 at the 2006 census.

The postal code of the area is 842.

Rabah was the home town of Sir Ahmadu Bello the first Premier of Northern Nigeria. He succeeded his father as the head of Rabah District in 1934. It also is an Arabic name (Rabah)

References

	

Local Government Areas in Sokoto State